Cerry Ezra "Jabe" Thomas (May 12, 1930 – June 4, 2015) was a NASCAR Grand National/Winston Cup Series driver who competed from the mid-1960s through the late 1970s. His son Ronnie was also a NASCAR Cup Series driver; competing from 1977 to 1989 and winning NASCAR's Rookie of the Year award in 1978.

Career
Thomas drove 75,243 laps of racing and earned $295,497 in total career money ($ when adjusted for inflation). Three finishes in the top five, 77 finishes in the top ten, and an average finish of 18th (his average start was 22nd) in his career were a part of his total statistics in the motorsport. Thomas started his Winston Cup Career at the age of 35 and ended it when he was 48 years old. Thomas competed in a total of 322 NASCAR Winston Cup events.

He was a competitor at least three major races of that era (the Fireball 300, the Tidewater 300, and the Yankee 400) along with the other important racing events of that era. Thomas is best known, however, for his performance during the 1971 and the 1974 NASCAR Cup Series seasons.

References

External links
 

1930 births
2015 deaths
NASCAR drivers
People from Christiansburg, Virginia
Racing drivers from Virginia
Neurological disease deaths in the United States
Deaths from Parkinson's disease